The 2016 VMI Keydets football team represented the Virginia Military Institute in the 2016 NCAA Division I FCS football season. It was VMI's 126th football season and the Keydets were led by second year head coach Scott Wachenheim. They played their home games at 10,000–seat Alumni Memorial Field at Foster Stadium, as they have since 1962. This was VMI's third season as a member of the Southern Conference, after playing for 11 seasons in the Big South Conference.  VMI was also a charter member of the Southern Conference, from 1921 through 2003. They finished the season 3–8, 1–7 in SoCon play to finish in a tie for eighth place.

Schedule

Source: Schedule

Game summaries

at Akron

at Morehead State

at Bucknell

Mercer

East Tennessee State

at Samford

at Chattanooga

Furman

at Western Carolina

The Citadel

at Wofford

References

VMI
VMI Keydets football seasons
VMI Keydets football